SS316 may refer to:

 USS Barbel (SS-316), a Balao-class submarine
 Grade 316 (stainless steel), a family of SAE marine steel grade